Paint by number or painting by numbers are kits having a board on which light markings to indicate areas to paint, and each area has a number and a corresponding numbered paint to use. The kits come with little compartmentalised boxes where the numbered colour pigments are stored. The users are encouraged to wash the paintbrush every time a new numbered colour is being used. The kits were invented, developed and marketed in 1950 by Max S. Klein, an engineer and owner of the Palmer Paint Company of Detroit, Michigan, and Dan Robbins, a commercial artist. When Palmer Paint introduced crayons to consumers, they also posted images online for a "Crayon by Number" version.

History 
The first patent for the paint by number technique was filed in 1923. 
Paint by Number in its popular form was created by the Palmer Show Card Paint Company. The owner of the company approached employee Dan Robbins with the idea for the project. After several iterations of the product, the company in 1951 introduced the Craft Master brand, which went on to sell over 12 million kits. This public response induced other companies to produce their own versions of paint by number. The Craft Master paint kit box tops proclaimed, "A BEAUTIFUL OIL PAINTING THE FIRST TIME YOU TRY."

Following the death of Max Klein in 1993, his daughter, Jacquelyn Schiffman, donated the Palmer Paint Co. archives to the  Smithsonian Museum of American History. The archival materials have been placed in the museum's Archives Center where they have been designated collection #544, the "Paint by Number Collection".

In 1992, Michael O'Donoghue and Trey Speegle organized and mounted a show of O'Donoghue's paint by number collection in New York City at the Bridgewater/Lustberg Gallery. After O'Donoghue's death in 1994, the Smithsonian Institution's National Museum of American History exhibited many key pieces from O'Donoghue's collection, now owned by Speegle, along with works from other collectors in 2001. 

In 2008, a private collector in Massachusetts assembled over 6,000 paint by number works dating back to the 1950s from eBay and other American collectors to create the Paint By Number Museum, the world's largest online archive of paint by number works. In 2011, the Museum of Modern Art in New York accepted four early designs of paint by number by Max Klein for its Department of Architecture and Design, donated by Jacquelyn Schiffman.

In May 2011, Dan Robbins and Palmer Paint Products, Inc., together developed and brought to market a new 60th-anniversary paint by number set.  This collectors' set was created in memory of the survivors and those who had lost their lives on September 11, 2001, and depicts the Twin Towers standing in spirit across the Manhattan skyline.

On April 1, 2019, Dan Robbins died in Sylvania, Ohio at the age of 93.

See also
 Mosaic
 Stained glass
 List of art techniques

References

Further reading

 William L. Bird, Jr. Paint by Number: The How-to Craze that Swept the Nation. Washington, D.C.: Smithsonian Institution, National Museum of American History in Association with Princeton Architectural Press, 2001.

Painting techniques